Olvera is a city in the province of Cádiz, Spain.

Olvera may also refer to:
Olvera Street, a street in Los Angeles, California, United States

People with the surname
Agustin Olvera (1818–1876), Mexican judge and administrator in Mexican California
José Antonio Olvera (born 1986), Mexican football player
Miguel Olvera (born 1939), Ecuadoran tennis player and coach

See also
Olivera, a surname